The 2017 League1 Ontario season was the third season of play for the Women's Division of League1 Ontario, a Division 3 semi-professional soccer league in the Canadian soccer pyramid and the highest level of soccer based in the Canadian province of Ontario.

For the first time, the league expanded to include teams in the nation's capital, Ottawa, allowing it to span from the western to eastern borders of southern Ontario.

Changes from 2016 
The women's division grew from nine to eleven teams, with the addition of Toronto Azzurri Blizzard, Unionville Milliken SC, and West Ottawa SC, while the Kingston Clippers women's side did not return for play.

Teams

Standings 
Each team plays 20 matches as part of the season; two games split home and away against every other team in the division. There are no playoffs; the first-place team is crowned as league champion at the end of the season.

Cup 
The cup tournament is a separate contest from the rest of the season, in which all eleven teams from the women's division take part.  It is not a form of playoffs at the end of the season (as is typically seen in North American sports), but is more like the Canadian Championship or the FA Cup, albeit only for League1 Ontario teams.  All matches are separate from the regular season and are not reflected in the season standings.

The cup tournament for the women's division is a single-match knockout tournament with four total rounds culminating in a final match in the start of August, with initial matchups determined by random draw.  Each match in the tournament must return a result; any match drawn after 90 minutes will advance directly to kicks from the penalty mark instead of extra time.

First Round

Quarterfinals

Semifinals

Final

Statistics

Top Goalscorers 

Updated to matches played on October 8, 2017.  Source:

Top Goalkeepers 

Updated to matches played on October 8, 2017.  Minimum 540 minutes played.  Source:

Awards 
The following players received honours in the 2017 season:

 First Team All-Stars

 Second Team All-Stars

 Third Team All-Stars

All-Star Game 
On June 28, the league announced that this year's all-star game would take place against the Ontario team competing in the 2017 Canada Summer Games. The rosters for this game will be selected by team & league officials, and was announced on July 25th.

References

External links 

League1 W
League1 Ontario (women) seasons